Rowland Winn may refer to:

Rowland Winn, 1st Baron St Oswald (1820–1893), industrialist, Conservative politician 
Rowland Winn, 2nd Baron St Oswald (1857–1919), Conservative MP, son of the above
Rowland Winn, 4th Baron St Oswald, (1916–1984), British soldier and Conservative MP